Olivia Bonelli (1920–1990) was an American operatic soprano.

Her career covered a span of almost 30 years, from the late 1940s through the 1970s. While short of attaining "super-star" status, she nevertheless enjoyed a popular, steady and accomplished vocal career. She went from a small town choir (Troy, New York) to become a soloist at New York's Radio City Music Hall, to several of the USA's major opera companies, a debut at New York City Opera (1956–1964), and the Metropolitan Opera for a special reading performance of Marvin David Levy's "Mourning Becomes Electra." Along the way, she spent a year traveling with the USO, entertaining wounded World War II servicemen in hospitals across the USA, premiered new works (Earl Wild's oratorio "Revelations", ABC-TV, 1962) and pioneered in the early days of television opera (La Traviata, ABC-TV, 1959). Her performances would receive reviews in major newspapers.

References
 The New York City Opera, by Martin L Sokol, Macmillan Publishing Company, Inc, 1981. 

1920 births
1990 deaths
American operatic sopranos
20th-century American women opera singers